The 1985 USC Trojans football team represented the University of Southern California during the 1985 NCAA Division I-A football season.

Schedule

Personnel

Rankings

Season summary

at No. 11 Illinois

Baylor

at Arizona State

Oregon State

Stanford

at Notre Dame

Washington State

at California

at Washington

UCLA

vs. Oregon

Source:

Aloha Bowl (vs. Alabama)

1986 NFL Draft
The following players were drafted into professional football following the season.

References

USC
USC Trojans football seasons
USC Trojans football